Timothy Shawn Teufel (born July 7, 1958) is an American former professional baseball second baseman and current coach. He also played for the Minnesota Twins and the San Diego Padres. He is currently a New York Mets minor league instructor and club ambassador. Teufel became known for his batting stance, the "Teufel shuffle", in which he wiggled his buttocks back and forth before the pitcher's delivery.

Early life
Teufel attended St. Mary's High School in Greenwich, Connecticut, St. Petersburg Junior College in St. Petersburg, Florida, and Clemson University in South Carolina. At Clemson, he earned All American honors and participated in the College World Series as a senior in 1980.

In 1979, Teufel played collegiate summer baseball for the Cotuit Kettleers of the Cape Cod Baseball League (CCBL). He batted .351 and set league records for home runs, runs batted in, and runs scored in a season. Teufel was inducted into the CCBL Hall of Fame in 2005.

At age 19, he was drafted by the Milwaukee Brewers in the sixteenth round of the 1978 Major League Baseball Draft, but did not sign. Teufel was drafted by the Chicago White Sox in the third round of the secondary phase of the 1979 Major League Baseball Draft, but again did not sign. In the 1980 Major League Baseball Draft, Teufel was drafted in the second round and signed with the Minnesota Twins.

Playing career

Minnesota Twins
In , Teufel lit up the International League with a .323 batting average, 1.022 OPS, 27 home runs and 100 runs batted in, resulting in a September call-up to the majors. He made his major league debut on September 3 in 13-0 drubbing at the hands of Scott McGregor and the Baltimore Orioles.

Teufel went 2-for-4 and score two runs to help the last place Twins snap a five-game losing streak on September 6. On September 16, Teufel led off the game by hitting his first major league home run off Jim Gott of the Toronto Blue Jays. His second career home run came in the eighth inning of the same game. In all, Teufel went 5-for-5 with two home runs and five runs scored in arguably the best offensive game of his career. By the end of the season, the Twins surpassed the Seattle Mariners to avoid a last place finish.

The following season, Teufel snatched the starting second base job away from former Rookie of the Year, John Castino. In his rookie season, Teufel had 149 hits, 30 doubles, fourteen home runs, 61 runs batted in, and provided solid defense at second base for the Twins. Teufel finished fourth behind Alvin Davis, Mark Langston and teammate Kirby Puckett in American League Rookie of the Year balloting.

Following the season, Teufel was traded with minor leaguer, Pat Crosby to the New York Mets for Billy Beane, Bill Latham and Joe Klink.

New York Mets

Although Teufel had hit far better against right-handed pitchers in 1985, Mets manager Davey Johnson used Teufel primarily against left-handed pitching in a platoon system with Wally Backman. His batting average hovered around .220 into June. On June 10, Teufel had one of the most exciting moments in the Mets' championship season with a walk-off pinch-hit grand slam in the bottom of the 11th inning against the Philadelphia Phillies.

The Mets' reputation as a rowdy bunch was punctuated on July 19 when Teufel, Ron Darling, Bob Ojeda, and Rick Aguilera were arrested after a bar fight with off-duty police officers in Houston, Texas. Teufel was sentenced to a year of probation and fined $200 for his part. None of the four missed any playing time, though the incident helped fuel some rivalry between the Mets and their impending 1986 National League Championship Series competitors, the Houston Astros. Teufel managed just one hit and no runs batted in against the Astros in the Championship Series, won by the Mets in six games.

In game one of the 1986 World Series against the Boston Red Sox, the Mets suffered a fate similar to that which they suffered in game one of the  World Series against the Oakland Athletics. In that game, usually sure-handed Mets' second baseman Félix Millán committed a third inning error that led to both of Oakland's runs in their 2–1 victory. With one out and a runner on second in the seventh inning of game one of the 1986 series, Boston's Rich Gedman hit a ground ball to Teufel at second which Teufel misplayed, allowing the runner to score. Boston held on for the 1–0 victory.

He hit a home run in game five of the Series, but the Mets lost that game. For the series, Teufel batted .444 with four hits in nine at bats. The home run was the only postseason run batted in and run scored of Teufel's career.

 was Teufel's best season statistically, as he tied his 1984 home run and run batted in highs despite playing in only 97 games. His .308 batting average, .398 on-base percentage and .545 slugging percentage were career-highs. Despite significantly outperforming Wally Backman, Teufel continued to be used in a platoon role.

Teufel was used in just one game in the 1988 NLCS. In , Gregg Jefferies was given most of the time at second base and Teufel spent half of his time at first base.

San Diego Padres
Teufel's  average was .118 on May 31 when the Mets traded him to the San Diego Padres for Garry Templeton. Teufel hit between .220 and .250 in all three seasons with San Diego while continuing to play at all three bases defensively. On April 14, he went 5-for-5 for the second time in his career but the Padres lost the game on their way to a 101-loss season. Teufel was granted free agency and retired after the 1993 season.

Coaching career
Teufel decided to take a break from baseball for the year.

He was named manager of the Savannah Sand Gnats on January 11,  and was a Mets representative at the 2008 Major League Baseball Draft. He returned as St. Lucie's manager in 2008 and 2009.  In 2010, in his first season managing the Double-A Binghamton Mets, he led the team to a 66–76 record and a fifth-place finish in the Eastern League. He was named manager of the Buffalo Bisons in January 2011. In 2011, he was named manager of Leones del Caracas in the Venezuelan Professional Baseball League. On November 16, 2011, he was replaced as manager by Carlos Lezcano.

Teufel returned to the New York Mets organization as the new third base coach in 2011, replacing former coach Chip Hale.
After the 2016 season, on November 15, 2016, it was announced that Teufel would be replaced by longtime Arizona Diamondbacks coach Glenn Sherlock. On Friday, November 25, it was announced that he would be the minor league instructor and club ambassador.

Career stats

References

External links
, or The Ultimate Mets Database, or Tim Teufel - Baseballbiography.com

1958 births
Living people
All-American college baseball players
Baseball coaches from Connecticut
Baseball players from Connecticut
Binghamton Mets managers
Brooklyn Cyclones managers
Buffalo Bisons (minor league) managers
Clemson Tigers baseball players
Cotuit Kettleers players
International League MVP award winners
Major League Baseball second basemen
Major League Baseball third base coaches
Minnesota Twins players
New York Mets coaches
New York Mets players
New York Mets scouts
San Diego Padres players
Sportspeople from Greenwich, Connecticut
St. Petersburg Titans baseball players
Orlando Twins players
Toledo Mud Hens players